The Perfect Wagnerite: A Commentary on the Niblung's Ring (originally published London, 1898) is a philosophical commentary on Richard Wagner's Der Ring des Nibelungen, by the Irish writer  George Bernard Shaw.

Shaw offered it to those enthusiastic admirers of Wagner who "were unable to follow his ideas, and do not in the least understand the dilemma of Wotan." According to Shaw:

Shaw interprets the Ring in Marxian terms as an allegory of the collapse of capitalism from its internal contradictions. Musicologically, his interpretation is noteworthy for its perception of the change in aesthetic direction beginning with the final scene of Siegfried, in which he claimed that the cycle turns from Musikdrama back towards opera.

References

External links
The Perfect Wagnerite Online 
 

 

1898 non-fiction books
Books by George Bernard Shaw
Irish non-fiction books
Der Ring des Nibelungen